The Eber gudgeon (Gobio intermedius) is a species of gudgeon, a small freshwater in the family Cyprinidae. It is found in streams flowing to Lakes Eber and Akşehir in central Anatolia. The species previously occurred in the lakes themselves but have been extirpated due to the lakes drying out and from pollution.

References
Notes

Bibliography
 

Gobio
Fish described in 1944